Point of Order! is a 1964 American documentary film by Emile de Antonio, about the Senate Army–McCarthy hearings of 1954.

Background
The Army–McCarthy hearings came about when the Army accused Senator Joseph McCarthy of improperly pressuring the Army for special privileges for Private G. David Schine, formerly of McCarthy's investigative staff. McCarthy counter-charged that the Army was holding Schine hostage to keep him from searching for Communists in the Army. The hearings were broadcast live on television in their entirety and also recorded via kinescope. This film was created from those kinescope recordings.

Synopsis
The film uses selections from the hearings to show the overall development of the trial, beginning with introductions from several main participants, such as Joseph N. Welch and McCarthy. Each participant is shown in a still image with a brief audio recording, except for McCarthy, who is introduced with longer footage of a speech he made during the hearings.

In a sequence titled "Charge and Countercharge", Senator Stuart Symington summarizes the principle charge and counter-charge of the case. This sequence includes questioning of Roy Cohn for allegedly threatening to "wreck the army" if David Schine were not made a General, a statement Cohn denies. The film follows with a scene in which the Army counsel questions the origin of a photograph of that shows Schine in a meeting with Secretary of the Army Robert T. Stevens; the photograph is shown to be cropped to suggest a closer relationship between Schine and Stevens, but McCarthy's counsel denies any knowledge of photographic alteration.

A sequence titled "The Accusation" shows McCarthy accusing a member of Welch's law firm (Fred Fisher) of membership in the National Lawyer's Guild, which McCarthy and others accused of serving the interests of the Communist Party USA. The sequence includes a frequently quoted exchange from the hearings: Welch asks McCarthy, "Have you no sense of decency, sir, at long last? Have you left no sense of decency?"
  
The film ends with a heated exchange between Symington and McCarthy that occurred when the hearings were about to adjourn for the day. Symington sharply questions the handling of McCarthy's secret files by his staff. McCarthy calls this a "smear" against the men on his staff; and, as Symington starts to leave, McCarthy accuses him of using "the same tactics that the Communist Party has used for too long." Symington returns to the microphone and says: "Apparently every time anybody says anything against anybody working for Senator McCarthy, he is declaring them and accusing them of being Communists!" Symington leaves and the hearings adjourn. McCarthy continues his passionate but repetitious defense of his staff and his attack on Symington, speaking to an increasingly empty chamber. The actual end to the hearings, in which McCarthy was cleared of any wrongdoing, does not appear in the film.

Production
Point of Order! was first imagined by Emile de Antonio and Daniel Talbot in 1961. De Antonio and Talbot thought a film about the Army–McCarthy hearings could be successful at Henry Rosenberg's New Yorker Theater. De Antonio persuaded Richard Ellison at CBS to help him find footage of the Army-McCarthy Hearings; Ellison informed de Antonio that the network held a complete set of kinescopes for the hearings. These kinescopes totaled nearly 188 hours. Talbot initially asked Orson Welles, then Irving Lerner to direct the film, but neither man agreed to do so. Talbot hired Paul Falkenberg to edit the film, and Falkenberg asked Richard Rovere to write narration for the film, to be read by Mike Wallace. However, when Falkenberg screened a rough cut of the film for the producers, they did not approve and decided to start over. De Antonio offered to direct the film for free, which Talbot accepted.

De Antonio hired a young editor named Robert Duncan to help edit the film. Their plan was to remove any narration, music, or added scenes and create a documentary using only the footage from the kinescopes of the hearings. This approach to filmmaking—which de Antonio would use on later films—was similar to the use of assemblage in the works of modern artists like Robert Rauschenberg, who was a friend of de Antonio. De Antonio said that his two main decisions with regard to making the film were "only footage from the actual hearings would be used" and "no preaching."

Exhibition
The film premiered in New York City on January 14, 1964. It was first distributed by Continental Distributing in 103 theaters nationwide. In 1968 it was recut and shown on television, with an added introduction by Paul Newman, to provide context for audiences unfamiliar with the Army–McCarthy hearings.

Several versions of Point of Order! have appeared on the home video market in the United States. The version with the Newman introduction was released by Zenger Video in 1984, with added instructional materials for classroom use. This version ran 102 minutes. In 1986, MPI Home Video released an abridged 49-minute version (with the Newman Introduction) under the title McCarthy, Death of a Witch Hunter: a Film of the Era of Senator Joseph R. McCarthy.    Point of Order! was released on DVD by New Yorker Films in 2005, in its original 97-minute cut.

Reception
De Antonio wrote that Point of Order! "may have been the first political documentary in the U.S. after World War II as well as a documentary which, in opposition to prevailing trends, also changed the form of documentary."

Critical reception to the film was largely positive. Among its proponents were Dwight Macdonald, Susan Sontag, Brendan Gill, and Stanley Kaufmann. Even Roy Cohn wrote about the film's historical significance, despite disagreement over the film's portrayals of him and Senator McCarthy. Some film critics felt that what de Antonio made was different from what most understood as a documentary. Judith Crist wrote in the New York Herald Tribune that "the producers have excerpted a superdocumentary instead of creating one of their own."

Book tie-in
In 1964, W.W. Norton & Company published the book Point of Order! A Documentary of the Army-McCarthy Hearings, in book form. The 108-page book featured still photos captured from the kinescopes of CBS. David T. Bazelon wrote the introduction and epilogue.

Honors
In 1993, this film was selected for preservation in the United States National Film Registry by the Library of Congress as being "culturally, historically, or aesthetically significant".

See also
List of American films of 1964
Joseph McCarthy
Roy Cohn
Army–McCarthy hearings

Notes

External links
Allmovie review of Point of Order! (via the New York Times)  

Point of Order on MUBI

1964 films
American documentary films
United States National Film Registry films
Films directed by Emile de Antonio
Films about McCarthyism
Documentary films about American politics
1964 documentary films
Collage film
Collage television
1960s English-language films
1960s American films